Profronde van Fryslan is a single-day road bicycle race held annually in June in Friesland, Netherlands. Since 2007, the race is organized as a 1.1 event on the UCI Europe Tour. Between 2004 and 2006 it was held as Noord-Nederland Tour, and in 2010 was known as the Batavus Pro Race.

Winners 

	

In 2004, due to the difficulty of the final , the organisers decided to award the leading group of 22 riders with an equal classification. The group consisted of: Tom Veelers, Arne Kornegoor, Rudie Kemna, Matthé Pronk, Eelke van der Wal, Allan Bo Andresen, Thorwald Veneberg, Roy Sentjens, Bobbie Traksel, Erik Dekker, Paul van Schalen, Arno Wallaard, Bert Hiemstra, Igor Abakoumov, Gerben Löwik, Rik Reinerink, Stefan Kupfernagel, Marvin van der Pluym, Dennis Haueisen, Nico Mattan, Niels Scheuneman and Preben Van Hecke.

External links
Official Website 

Cycle races in the Netherlands
UCI Europe Tour races
Recurring sporting events established in 2004
2004 establishments in the Netherlands